The 1999 Robert Morris Colonials football team represented Robert Morris College, now Robert Morris University, as a member of the Northeast Conference (NEC) during the 1999 NCAA Division I-AA football season. The Colonials were led by 6th-year head coach Joe Walton and played their home games at Moon Stadium on the campus of Moon Area High School. The Colonials finished the 1999 season with their fourth consecutive NEC championship.

Schedule

References

Robert Morris
Robert Morris Colonials football seasons
Northeast Conference football champion seasons
Robert Morris Colonials football